Ammonium heptamolybdate is the inorganic compound whose chemical formula is (NH4)6Mo7O24, normally encountered as the tetrahydrate.  A dihydrate is also known. It is a colorless solid, often referred to as ammonium paramolybdate or simply as ammonium molybdate, although "ammonium molybdate" can also refer to ammonium orthomolybdate, (NH4)2MoO4, and several other compounds. It is one of the more common molybdenum compounds.

Synthesis 
Ammonium heptamolybdate is easily prepared by dissolving molybdenum trioxide in an excess of aqueous ammonia and evaporating the solution at room temperature. While the solution evaporates, the excess of ammonia escapes. This method results in the formation of six-sided transparent prisms of the tetrahydrate of ammonium heptamolybdate.

Solutions of ammonium paramolybdate react with acids to form molybdic acid and an ammonium salt. The pH value of a concentrated solution will lie between 5 and 6.

Structure
The compound was first analyzed crystallographically by Lindqvist, but has been reanalyzed.  All Mo centers are octahedral.  Some oxide ligands are terminal, some doubly bridging, and a few are triply bridging ligands.

Uses 
as an analytical reagent to measure the amount of phosphates, silicates, arsenates and lead in aqueous solution (e.g. pigments, river water, sea water etc.)
in the production of molybdenum metal and ceramics
in the preparation of dehydrogenation and desulfurization catalysts
in the fixing of metals
in electroplating
in fertilizers for crops.
as a negative stain in biological electron microscopy, typically in the 3–5% (vol/vol) concentration range and in the presence of trehalose; or at saturated concentration to perform cryo-negative staining.
For the detection of recreational drugs as a component of the Froehde reagent

Related compounds
Potassium heptamolybdate, also obtained as the tetrahydrate, is very similar to the ammonium salt.

Safety 
Molybdates are typically of low toxicity, so much so that few reports of incidents have ever been reported.

References

See also 
Phosphate test aka Deniges' method links to here.

Molybdates
Ammonium compounds